Trachelophorus is a genus of weevils in the leaf-rolling weevil family Attelabidae.

Several species are known as giraffe weevils because of their elongated "necks". The best known species is Trachelophorus giraffa.

Species include:
Trachelophorus abdominalis  
Trachelophorus ardea 
Trachelophorus ater  
Trachelophorus camelus 
Trachelophorus castaneus  
Trachelophorus dromas 
Trachelophorus elegans  
Trachelophorus fausti  
Trachelophorus foveicollis  
Trachelophorus giraffa 
Trachelophorus giraffoides 
Trachelophorus limbatus  
Trachelophorus madegassus  
Trachelophorus michaelis 
Trachelophorus numeralis  
Trachelophorus pygmaeus  
Trachelophorus rubrodorsatus  
Trachelophorus signatus
Trachelophorus uniformis

References

Attelabidae